{{Infobox settlement
| name                    = Macroregion One
| native_name             = Macroregiunea Unu Makrorégió Egy 
| settlement_type         = Region
| image_map               = România macroregiunea 1.svg
| subdivision_type        = Country
| subdivision_name        = 
| area_total_km2          = 68,241
| population_total        = 5,297,055
| population_as_of        = July 2012<ref>{{Cite web |url=http://www.indexmundi.com/romania/demographics_profile.html |title=Index Mundi – Romania demographics profile (2012) |access-date=2012-11-22 |archive-url=https://web.archive.org/web/20111108032354/http://www.indexmundi.com/romania/demographics_profile.html |archive-date=2011-11-08 |url-status=live }}</ref>
| population_density_km2  = auto
|timezone1                = EET
|utc_offset1              = +2
|timezone1_DST            = EEST
|utc_offset1_DST          = +3
}}
Macroregion One (Romanian: Macroregiunea Unu'') is a statistical (NUTS 1) region of Romania. It consists of two development regions (Northwest and Center), twelve counties, respectively.

Geography

Climate 

Due to geographical position, climate expresses the natural setting of the relief, region benefiting from a temperate continental climate with warm summers, cold winters, high precipitation, with small differences between mountain, plain and hilly areas. In the village of Bod (Brașov County), was recorded the absolute minimum temperature (−38.5 °C), on January 25, 1942.

References 

Subdivisions of Romania
NUTS 1 statistical regions of the European Union